Església de Sant Joan de Caselles  is a church located in Canillo, Andorra. It is a heritage property registered in the Cultural Heritage of Andorra. It was built in the 11–12th century.

Art 
Inside the building different artistic pieces are preserved, the main one being a large stucco image of Christ in Majesty, as well as a mural with frescoes depicting scenes from Calvary with Saint Longinus and Stephaton, accompanied by the half-hidden Sun and Moon, works from the 12th century.

There is also a retable dating from the 16th century of exceptional quality. Influenced by the Italian and Germanic Renaissance style, it depicts scenes from the life and martyrdom of Saint John the apostle, author of the book of revelation and patron saint of the church, in particular his visions in Patmos.

References

Canillo
Roman Catholic churches in Andorra
Cultural Heritage of Andorra